Shahkot may refer to:

Shahkot, Pakistan, a town and tehsil of Nankana Sahib District, Punjab
Shahkot, India, a town and Nagar Panchayat of Jalandhar district, Punjab